Phil Spector International was a record label operated between 1970 and 1980 by Malcolm Jones. It served as a reissue label for the catalogue of Phil Spector's Philles Records.

Among its reissues was a six volume set called "Phil Spector Wall Of Sound". The volumes were:

Vol. 1 The Ronettes - ... Presenting the Fabulous Ronettes featuring Veronica (Super 2307 003).
Vol. 2 Bob B. Soxx & the Blue Jeans - Zip-A-Dee Doo Dah (Super 2307 004).
Vol. 3 The Crystals - The Crystals Sing Their Greatest Hits (Super 2307 006).
Vol. 4 Various Artists - Yesterday's Hits Today (Super 2307 007).
Vol. 5 Various Artists - Rare Masters Vol. 1 (Super 2307 008).
Vol. 6 Various Artists - Rare Masters Vol. 2 (Super 2307 009).

See also
 List of record labels

American record labels
Phil Spector
Record labels established in 1970
Record labels disestablished in 1980
Vanity record labels
Reissue record labels
American companies established in 1970
American companies established in 1980